The Trou Sallé River is a river of Saint Lucia.

See also
List of rivers of Saint Lucia

References
 

Rivers of Saint Lucia